Valeri Shmarov may refer to:
 Valeriy Nikolayevich Shmarov (1945–2018), Ukrainian politician
 Valeri Valentinovich Shmarov (born 1965), Soviet and Russian soccer player